Say What You Will... (also known as Say What You Will, Clarence...Karl Sold the Truck and Say What You Will...Anything Can Happen) is the debut studio album by American rock band Soul Asylum. It was originally released on August 24, 1984 by Twin/Tone Records, and produced by Hüsker Dü's Bob Mould.

Releases
Now out of print, the original version Say What You Will... consisted of nine songs, and sold 6,738 vinyl copies and 2,639 cassettes. The album was reissued under the title Say What You Will, Clarence...Karl Sold the Truck on CD in 1988 with five extra songs that had been cut from the original release. These five had been previously available only on Soul Asylum's rare cassette release, Time's Incinerator (1986). It was then reissued again in 2018 on CD and vinyl, which also included tracks from Soul Asylum's prior band, Loud Fast Rules. The 2018 release was retitled to Say What You Will...Anything Can Happen.

"Karl Sold the Truck" refers to bassist Karl Mueller selling their Chevrolet pickup truck for a larger Dodge van which would be their transportation for their 1984 tour.

Track listing
All songs written by Dave Pirner.

"Draggin' Me Down" – 2:08*
"Long Day" – 2:46
"Money Talks" – 2:32
"Voodoo Doll" – 3:42
"Stranger" – 3:44
"Do You Know" – 1:54*
"Sick of That Song" – 0:52
"Religiavision" – 5:09
"Spacehead" – 2:08*
"Walking" – 2:20
"Broken Glass" – 2:23*
"Masquerade" – 5:16*
"Happy" – 2:45
"Black and Blue" – 3:27

Notes:

*: Songs added to the re-release of the album.

Singles
"Walking"
"Happy"
"Religiavision"

Personnel 
Soul Asylum

 Pat Morley – drums
 Karl Mueller – bass guitar
 Dan Murphy – guitar, vocals
 Dave Pirner – vocals, guitar, saxophone

Production

 Steve Fjelstad – engineer
 Blake Gumprecht – co-producer
 Bob Mould – producer
 Howie Weinberg – mastering (original edition)

References

Soul Asylum albums
1984 debut albums
Albums produced by Bob Mould
Twin/Tone Records albums